ProSpace is a nonprofit citizens space advocacy group.

Every year in March many of the group's members travel to Washington, D.C. for an event called "March Storm." Annually, these members speak to the congressional leaders in an attempt to open space for the average citizen. One such  initiative is expanding the use of prize competitions that would spur space innovations and the creation of a National Space Prize Board (NSPB).

ProSpace helped push the passage of space-related legislative initiatives, among those includes the Commercial Space Act of 1998, space solar power programs, and technology development for the reusable launch system.

See also
National Space Society
Space colonization
Space Frontier Foundation
Vision for Space Exploration

References

External links
Official website

Space organizations
Non-profit organizations based in the United States
Space colonization
Space advocacy organizations